The J. Newton Conger House is a historic house located at 334 North Knox Street in Oneida, Illinois. P. G. Hubbard had the house built in 1860; four years later, it was sold to J. Newton Conger, a livestock shipper and prominent local citizen. The house has a Carpenter Gothic design described as the best example of the style in Knox County. The front porch and the roof's steep gables feature gingerbread trim along the edges, a characteristic feature of the style. The house's tall and narrow windows have decorative hat-like surrounds along the top and upper sides.

References

Houses on the National Register of Historic Places in Illinois
Carpenter Gothic architecture in Illinois
Houses completed in 1860
Galesburg, Illinois
National Register of Historic Places in Knox County, Illinois